Dodonaeoideae is a subfamily of flowering plants in the soapberry family, Sapindaceae.

Genera
Genera recognized by the Angiosperm Phylogeny Website.

 Arfeuillea Pierre ex Radlk.
 Averrhoidium Baill.
 Cossinia Comm. ex Lam.
 Diplokeleba N.E.Br.
 Diplopeltis Endl.
 Distichostemon F. Mueller
 Dodonaea Mill.
 Doratoxylon Thouars ex Benth. & Hook.f.
 †Euchorium Ekman & Radlk.
 Euphorianthus Radlk.
 Eurycorymbus Hand.-Mazz.
 Exothea Macfad.
 Filicium Thwaites
 Ganophyllum Blume
 Harpullia Roxb.
 Hippobromus Eckl. & Zeyh.
 Hypelate P.Browne
 Llagunoa Ruiz & Pav.
 Loxodiscus Hook.f.
 Magonia A.St.-Hil.
 Majidea Kirk ex Oliv.
 Zanha Hiern

References

 
Rosid subfamilies